Me(a)gan Hanson may refer to:

Megan Hanson, character in Premonition (2007 film)
Megan Barton Hanson, in Love Island (2015 TV series, series 4) 
Meagan Hanson, politician